Hassan II University of Casablanca (UH2C) (Arabic: جامعة الحسن الثاني بالدار البیضاء‎; French: Université Hassan II de Casablanca), established in 1975, is a public university which is the result of a recent merger since 1 September 2014 of two universities: Hassan II University Ain Chock - Casablanca and the Hassan II University Mohammedia.

Overview 
There are over 24,000 total students, including local and foreign. Full-time faculty teachers and professors are over eleven hundred, making it the third largest university in Morocco. Official staff total 850 people.

Arabic and French are the languages of tuition at the university. For some disciplines such as law, international law and international relations, and for PhD students, it is necessary to know both French and Arabic. Technical courses, however, are offered in French only . The university is a member of the International Association of Research Universities (IARU). Foreign students are largely from French-speaking countries: Senegal, Congo Reublic, DR Congo, Mauritania, Libya, Tunisia, Algeria, Mali, Yemen, Indonesia, Malaysia, and France are the main sources.

Library 
It has 40,000 textbooks, and 20,000 electronic online journals are available for students. There are 550 ancient manuscripts and 600 books, with 100 periodicals. The School of Law Library has 25 thousand books in the fields of law and political science and economics.

Ranking 

According to the webometrics of Hassan II University of Casablanca has a world ranking of 2091, sixth in Morocco, and 36th in north Africa.

The faculties 
 Faculty of Law, economic and social sciences. (located in Casablanca, Aïn Chock)
Number of students: Approx 10000
 Faculty of Medicine and Pharmacy of Casablanca
Number of students:  4200
 Faculty of Dentistry Casablanca (MunicipalityAïn Chock)
 Faculty of Sciences Aîn Chock Casablanca (MunicipalityAïn Chock)
Number of students: 2800
 Faculty of Arts and Humanities
Number of students: 9300
(MunicipalityAïn Chock)
 Graduate School of Technology Casablanca (EST)
Number of students: 830
 School of Mechanical Engineering
Number of students: 590
 National School of Business and Management of Casablanca (ENCG Casablanca), located in Aïn Sbâa has been created in 2007 and is already eighth best establishment and third best business school in the country.

Schools
 École Nationale Supérieure des Arts et des Métiers Casablanca (ENSAM)
 Graduate School of Technology (EST)
 École nationale supérieure d'électricité et de mécanique (ENSEM)
 school of natural (ENS)
 National School of Business and Management of Casablanca|École nationale de commerce et de gestion de Casablanca (ENCG Casablanca)

Notable faculty
 Soumaya Naamane Guessous - sociologist and feminist activist
 Fatima Marouan (born 1952) - endocrinologist; politician
 Habib Mazini (born 1954) - academic and writer
 Abd Al Latif Mahfouz - literary scholar
 Salem Al Ketbi - political scientist

Notable alumni
 Mohamed Taieb Naciri (1939-2012) - lawyer and politician
 Abdelouahed Belkeziz (1939-2021) - lawyer, politician, and diplomat.
 Khalid Alioua (born 1949) - politician
 Mokhtar Lamani (born 1952) - Canadian diplomat
 Mohamed Moatassim (born 1956) - political advisor
 Nabila Mounib (born 1960) - politician
 Nizar Ibrahim (born 1962) - paleontologist
 Abdelaziz El Omari (born 1968) - politician
 Merieme Chadid (born 1969) - astronomer
 Brother Rachid (born 1971) - religious television commentator
 Khadija Yaken (born 1972) - writer of prose and poetry
 Nabila Rmili (born 1974) - politician

See also
 List of universities in Morocco
 Lists of universities and colleges by country

References

External links 
  Official website

 Top Colleges & Universities in Morocco

 
1975 establishments in Morocco
Educational institutions established in 1975
Hassan II
20th-century architecture in Morocco